Imre Mándi (22 November 1916 – 1943) was a Hungarian boxer who competed in the 1936 Summer Olympics. He was eliminated in the quarterfinals of the welterweight class after losing his fight to the upcoming gold medalist Sten Suvio. Next year he won a silver medal at the European championships.

Mándi was Jewish and died in a Nazi labor camp during World War II.

References

1916 births
1943 deaths
Welterweight boxers
Olympic boxers of Hungary
Boxers at the 1936 Summer Olympics
Hungarian Jews who died in the Holocaust
Jewish boxers
Hungarian male boxers
Hungarian people who died in Nazi concentration camps
Hungarian civilians killed in World War II
Hungarian World War II forced labourers